Hans Silfverberg (fl. 1978) is a Finnish entomologist. The beetle species Apion silfverbergi, Hyperaspis silfverbergi, and Sasajiscymnus silfverbergi are named in his honour.

He has described the following taxon:
 Anatela Silfverberg, 1982

Among his scientific contributions is a list of the Coleoptera present in the Baltic and Nordic countries, which he published in 1992.

References

Living people
Finnish entomologists
Year of birth missing (living people)
Place of birth missing (living people)
Academic staff of the University of Helsinki